Patrizia Toia (born 17 March 1950) is an Italian politician and member of the European Parliament for North-West with Democratic Party, part of the group of the Progressive Alliance of Socialists and Democrats.

Education
 Graduate in political science (Università degli Studi, Milan)
 Specialised in strategic planning (Bocconi University, Milan)
 Managerial post at Executive Committee of the Lombardy Region
 Member of the federal executive and 'La Margherita' provincial party coordinator for Milan

Career
 1975-1985: Municipal Councillor of Vanzago (Milan)
 1994-1995: Member of Lombardy Regional Council (1985–1995), Member of Regional Executive with responsibility for coordination of social services (1989–1990), health (1990–1991) and the budget
 1995-1996: Member of the Chamber of Deputies of Italy
 1996-2001: Under-Secretary of State for Foreign Affairs, Minister for Community Policies, Minister for Relations with Parliament
 1996-2004: Senator

Member of the European Parliament
In the European Parliament, Toia serves on the Committee on Industry, Research and Energy. In this capacity, she is the Parliament’s rapporteur on the introduction of 5G. Since 2021, she has been part of the Parliament's delegation to the Conference on the Future of Europe.

Toia is also a substitute for the Committee on Employment and Social Affairs, a member of the Delegation to the EU-Chile Joint Parliamentary Committee and a substitute for the Delegation to the EU-Mexico Joint Parliamentary Committee.

In addition to her committee assignments, Toia is a member of the MEP Heart Group (sponsored by the European Heart Network (EHN) and the European Society of Cardiology (ESC)), a group of parliamentarians who have an interest in promoting measures that will help reduce the burden of cardiovascular diseases (CVD), and the MEPs Against Cancer group. She is also a member of the European Parliament Intergroup on Cancer; the European Parliament Intergroup on Integrity (Transparency, Anti-Corruption and Organized Crime); the European Parliament Intergroup on Extreme Poverty and Human Rights; and of the European Parliament Intergroup on Children’s Rights.

See also 
2004 European Parliament election in Italy

References

External links

 
 

1950 births
Living people
People from the Province of Milan
Italian Roman Catholics
Christian Democracy (Italy) politicians
Italian People's Party (1994) politicians
Deputies of Legislature XII of Italy
Senators of Legislature XIII of Italy
Senators of Legislature XIV of Italy
Democratic Party (Italy) MEPs
Democracy is Freedom – The Daisy MEPs
MEPs for Italy 2004–2009
MEPs for Italy 2009–2014
MEPs for Italy 2014–2019
MEPs for Italy 2019–2024
21st-century women MEPs for Italy
Women government ministers of Italy
Bocconi University alumni
20th-century Italian women
Women members of the Chamber of Deputies (Italy)
Women members of the Senate of the Republic (Italy)